The Woman and the Puppet is a 1920 American silent film starring Geraldine Farrar and Lou Tellegen that was directed by Reginald Barker and produced by Samuel Goldwyn.

Plot
Based upon a review in a film publication, Don Mateo (Tellegen) attempts to bribe the mother (Dione) of Concha Perez (Farrar) so that he can use her as his toy, but Concha leaves and becomes a cigarette girl who dances at a wharf cafe. When Don Mateo discovers her there dancing for some Englishmen, he no longer believes that she is the virtuous maiden who spurned his advances.

Concha convinces him that his suspicions are wrong and unwarranted. The Don is a conceited person used to adulation of senoritas, and when Concha leads him on a chase and vamps him, he becomes enraptured. The lovers then have a series of quarrels, jealousies, and other mishaps until they reach a final understanding.

Cast
Geraldine Farrar as Concha Perez
Lou Tellegen as Don Mateo
Dorothy Cumming as Bianca
Bertram Grassby as Philippe
Macey Harlam as El Morenito
Cristina Pereda as Pepa
Amparito Guillot as Mercedes
Milton Ross as Miguel
Rose Dione as Concha's Mother

Preservation status
This film is extant in several film archives.

References

External links

Progressive Silent Film List: The Woman and the Puppet at silentera.com

1920 films
American silent feature films
Films based on French novels
American films based on plays
Films directed by Reginald Barker
1920 drama films
Films based on adaptations
Silent American drama films
American black-and-white films
Goldwyn Pictures films
Films based on works by Pierre Louÿs
1920s American films